The Hunter 33 is an American sailboat that was designed by John Cherubini and first built in 1977.

The design was originally marketed by the manufacturer as the Hunter 33, but is often confused with the 2004 Hunter 33-2004, which was also sold as the Hunter 33, and the 2012 Hunter E33, which is in production as the Marlow-Hunter 33.

Production
The design was built by Hunter Marine in the United States, but it is now out of production.

Design
The Hunter 33 is a small recreational keelboat, built predominantly of fiberglass, with wood trim. It has a masthead sloop rig, a raked stem, a raised reverse transom, an internally-mounted spade-type rudder controlled by a wheel and a fixed fin keel. It displaces  and carries  of ballast.

The boat is fitted with an inboard motor for docking and maneuvering.

With the standard keel the design has a PHRF racing average handicap of 144 with a high of 150 and low of 141. With the shoal draft keel the design has a PHRF average handicap of 165 with a high of 174 and low of 156.

See also
List of sailing boat types

Similar sailboats
Abbott 33
Alajuela 33
Arco 33
C&C 3/4 Ton
C&C 33
Cape Dory 33
Cape Dory 330
CS 33
Endeavour 33
Hans Christian 33
Hunter 33-2
Hunter 33-2004
Hunter 33.5
Hunter 333
Hunter 336
Hunter 340
Mirage 33
Moorings 335
Nonsuch 33
Tanzer 10
Viking 33
Watkins 33

References

External links
Official brochure

Keelboats
1970s sailboat type designs
Sailing yachts
Sailboat type designs by John Cherubini
Sailboat types built by Hunter Marine